Dvapara Yuga ( Dwapara Yuga), in Hinduism, is the third and third best of the four yugas (world ages) in a Yuga Cycle, preceded by Treta Yuga and followed by Kali Yuga. Dvapara Yuga lasts for 864,000 years (2,400 divine years).

According to the Puranas, this yuga ended when Krishna returned to his eternal abode of Vaikuntha. There are only two pillars of religion during the Dvapara Yuga: compassion and truthfulness. Vishnu assumes the colour yellow and the Vedas are categorized into four parts: Rig Veda, Sama Veda, Yajur Veda and Atharva Veda. During these times, the Brahmins are knowledgeable of two or three of these but rarely have studied all the four Vedas thoroughly. Accordingly, because of this categorization, different actions and activities come into existence.

Etymology

Dvapara Yuga, sometimes spelled Dwapara Yuga, means "the age of two", where its length is two times that of Kali Yuga, and the Dharma bull, which symbolizes morality, stands on two legs during this period.

Dvapara Yuga is described in the Mahabharata, Manusmriti, Surya Siddhanta, Vishnu Smriti, and various Puranas.

Duration and structure

Hindu texts describe four yugas (world ages)⁠ in a Yuga Cycle, where, starting in order from the first age of Krita (Satya) Yuga, each yuga's length decreases by one-fourth (25%), giving proportions of 4:3:2:1. Each yuga is described as having a main period ( yuga proper) preceded by its  (dawn) and followed by its  (dusk)⁠, where each twilight (dawn/dusk) lasts for one-tenth (10%) of its main period. Lengths are given in divine years (years of the gods), each lasting for 360 solar (human) years.

Dvapara Yuga, the third age in a cycle, lasts for 864,000 years (2,400 divine years), where its main period lasts for 720,000 years (2,000 divine years) and its two twilights each lasts for 72,000 years (200 divine years). The current cycle's Dvapara Yuga has the following dates based on Kali Yuga, the fourth and present age, starting in 3102BCE:

Mahabharata, Book 12 (Shanti Parva), Ch. 231:

Manusmriti, Ch. 1:

Surya Siddhanta, Ch. 1:

Characteristics

All people in the Dvapara Yuga are desirous of achievement of the scriptural dharma that is prescribed to each class, valiant, courageous and competitive by nature and are engaged only in penance and charity. They are kingly and pleasure-seeking. In this era, the divine intellect ceases to exist, and it is therefore seldom that anyone is wholly truthful. As a result of this life of deceit, people are plagued by ailments, diseases and various types of desires. After suffering from these ailments, people realize their misdeeds and perform penance. Some also organize yajnas (sacred fire rituals) for material benefits as well as for divinity.

Brahmana
In this Yuga, the Brahmanas are involved in yajnas (sacred fire rituals), self-study and teaching activities. They attain celestial bliss by engaging in penance, religion, control of senses, and restraint.

Kshatriya
The duties of Kshatriyas are the protection of their subjects. In this era, they are humble and perform their duties by controlling their senses. The Kshatriyas honestly execute all policies of law and order without being angry or cruel. They are devoid of injustice towards the ordinary citizens and consequently attain bliss.

The king avails the advice of the learned scholars and accordingly maintains law and order in his empire. The king who is addicted to vices will definitely end up defeated. That is why Yudhisthira never got defeated as he had no vices despite being only a Rathi and other kings being Atirathis and Maharathis, some Atimaharathis also. One or two or all from Sāma, Dāna, Danda, Bheda and Upeksha is/are brought into use and help attain the desired. Kings are diligent in maintaining public decorum and order.

A few of the kings, however, surreptitiously plan a conspiracy along with the scholars. Strong people execute work where execution of policies is involved. The king appoints priests, etc. to perform religious activities, economists and ministers to perform monetary activities, impotents to take care of women, and cruel men to execute heinous activities.

There are two kshatriya dynasties, namely 'Surya (solar) Vansha' and 'Chandra (lunar) Vansha'.

Vaishya
Vaishyas are mostly landowners and merchants. The duties of Vaishyas are trade and agriculture. Vaishyas attain higher planes through charity and hospitality.

Shudra
The duty of Shudras is to perform tasks that demand highly physical work. Vedas says everyone is a born shudra and with their deeds, they can become a kshatriya, brahmana, or vaishya. For political reasons Shudras had difficulty going up the ranks unless they were extraordinary. Vidura, the famous Prime Minister of Hastinapura was born in the Shudra community and attained the status of a Brahmin due to his wisdom, righteousness, and learning.

See also
 Hindu units of time
 Kalpa (day of Brahma)
 Manvantara (age of Manu)
 Pralaya (period of dissolution)
 Yuga Cycle (four yuga ages): Satya (Krita), Treta, Dvapara, and Kali
 Itihasa (Hindu Tradition)
 List of numbers in Hindu scriptures
 Vedic-Puranic chronology

Notes

References

Four Yugas
Shabda